Northern Light Venture Capital (NLVC) is a Chinese venture capital firm founded in 2005. It focuses on investing in companies in the technology and healthcare sectors.

Background 

NLVC was founded in 2005 by Feng Deng, Jeffrey Lee and Yan Ke. Feng Deng and Yan Ke were previously co-founders of  NetScreen Technologies, an IT Security company that went public on Nasdaq in 2001 and was later acquired by Juniper Networks in 2004 for $4.2 billion. New Enterprise Associates and Min Zhu (co-founder of Webex) were initial backers of the firm when it was raising its first fund. Greylock Partners is another early backer of the firm.

NLVC  invests 70% of its funds into Series A rounds, 20% in Series B rounds and 10% into Seed rounds.

NLVC has offices in Silicon Valley,  Hong Kong and several cities in China including, Beijing, Shanghai.

Funds

Notable investments 

 Actions Semiconductor
 Aerohive Networks
 APUS Group
 BGI Group
 Binance.US
 Chukong Technologies
 Crossbar
 Dianrong
 Drive.ai
 Kunlun Fight
 Meituan
 Qumulo
 Segway Inc.
 Tencent Music
 UNISOC
 VIPKID
 Zynex

References

External links
 

Chinese companies established in 2005
Financial services companies established in 2005
Investment management companies of China
Venture capital firms of China